The legislative districts of Sorsogon are the representations of the province of Sorsogon in the various national legislatures of the Philippines. The province is currently represented in the lower house of the Congress of the Philippines through its first and second congressional districts.

History 
Sorsogon initially comprised a single district to the Malolos Congress from 1898 to 1899. It was later divided into two congressional districts since 1907, which included Masbate until it was given its own representation in 1922. From 1978 to 1984, it was part of the representation of Region V in the Interim Batasang Pambansa, and it elected two assemblymen at-large in the Regular Batasang Pambansa from 1984 to 1986.

Current Districts

Historical Districts

At-Large (defunct)

1943–1944

1984–1986

See also 
Legislative districts of Masbate

References 

Sorsogon
Politics of Sorsogon